The Zuun Mod deposit is one of the largest molybdenum and copper porphyry deposits in Mongolia. The deposit is located in southwestern Mongolia and its mining license is owned 100% by Erdene Resource Development Corporation. The Zuun Mod deposit has NI 43-101 compliant measured and indicated resource amounting to 218 million tonnes of ore grading 0.057% molybdenum  and 0.069% copper at a 0.04% molybdenum cutoff grade. This results in 273.5 million pounds of contained molybdenum metal and 330.7 million pounds of contained copper metal.

See also
List of molybdenum mines

References 

Molybdenum mines in Mongolia